Liubomyr Lemeshko (born July 19, 1992) is a Ukrainian swimmer. He competed at the 2016 Summer Olympics in the men's 100 metre butterfly; his time of 52.51 seconds in the heats did not qualify him for the semifinals.

References

1992 births
Living people
Ukrainian male swimmers
Olympic swimmers of Ukraine
Swimmers at the 2016 Summer Olympics
Male butterfly swimmers
21st-century Ukrainian people